Lassetter is a surname. Notable people with the surname include:

Don Lassetter (born 1933), American baseball player
Harry Lassetter (1860–1926), Australian military officer and businessman
Jane Hansen Lassetter, American nurse and academic administrator

See also 
 Lasseter (disambiguation)